Live in Dublin is a (triple) live album by Canadian singer-songwriter Leonard Cohen. It is the audio recording of his three-hour concert on 12 September 2013 at The O2 Arena, Dublin, Ireland.

Background
The album was released on 2 December 2014 and was recorded in September 2013 at Dublin's The O2 Arena.  After only releasing two live albums in the first 24 years of his recording career, Live in Dublin was Cohen's fourth live LP since 2009.  The album is very similar to the album Live in London (2009) but contains renditions of several songs from his more recent albums, such as "Amen", "The Darkness", "Alexandra Leaving", and "Come Healing."  The album received uniformly positive reviews upon its release, with aggregator Metacritic calculating a score of 83 out of 100 based on six reviews, indicating "Universal acclaim". While acknowledging that much of the material overlapped with the 2009 release Live in London, Rolling Stone called the new album "well worth the price". In another positive review for Exclaim!, Mackenzie Herd wrote that Cohen "still manages to mesmerize audiences around the world with perpetually relevant and insightful work, leaving packed and satisfied stadiums in his wake like he does here."

Track listing

DVD bonus features

Charts

Weekly charts

Year-end charts

References

External links
LeonardCohen.com – Official Leonard Cohen Website

Leonard Cohen live albums
2014 live albums
Columbia Records live albums